"Champion Sound" is a song by English big beat musician Fatboy Slim from his compilation album The Greatest Hits - Why Try Harder. It features Lateef the Truth Speaker on the vocal track. An alternate version featured on the US version of The Greatest Hits – Why Try Harder features both Lateef the Truth Speaker and Sharon Woolf. It is known for its music video, which features objects falling in a sequence like dominoes. The single peaked at number 88 on the UK Singles Chart.

Track listing 

 CD

 12" vinyl

Music video 

The music video for the song shows various objects toppling down like dominoes as the sequence moves across an apartment resided by two girls. The video ends with a cameo appearance by Norman Cook (Fatboy Slim). In the first part of the video, various Fatboy Slim CDs are seen being used as dominoes, including the UK release of The Greatest Hits – Why Try Harder.

Charts

References 

2006 singles
Fatboy Slim songs
Songs written by Norman Cook
2006 songs
Skint Records singles